Tony Washington may refer to the following people: 

Tony Washington (offensive lineman) (born 1986), offensive lineman in the Canadian Football League
Tony Washington (linebacker), American football linebacker
Tony Washington (wide receiver), American football wide receiver

See also
Anthony Washington